Lookout Mountain is a city entirely within Walker County, Georgia, United States. Bordering its sister town of Lookout Mountain, Tennessee, Lookout Mountain is part of the Chattanooga metropolitan statistical area. The population was 1,641 at the 2020 census. The city is located on Lookout Mountain, home to such attractions as Rock City.  This city is often named as home to Covenant College, but the college is actually across the county line in Dade County.

Geography

Lookout Mountain is located at  (34.975307, -85.354826).

According to the United States Census Bureau, the city has a total area of 2.7 square miles (6.9 km2), all of it land.

Demographics

2020 census

As of the 2020 United States census, there were 1,641 people, 612 households, and 465 families residing in the city.

2000 census
As of the census of 2000, there were 1,617 people, 618 households, and 441 families residing in the city. The racial makeup of the city was 99.01% White, 0.19% Asian, 0.25% from other races, and 0.56% from two or more races. Hispanic or Latino of any race were 0.80% of the population.

There were 618 households, out of which 36.4% had children under the age of 18 living with them, 65.5% were married couples living together, 4.5% had a female householder with no husband present, and 28.6% were non-families. 24.8% of all households were made up of individuals, and 11.8% had someone living alone who was 65 years of age or older.  The average household size was 2.62 and the average family size was 3.16.

In the city, the population was spread out, with 29.8% under the age of 18, 5.3% from 18 to 24, 27.7% from 25 to 44, 21.8% from 45 to 64, and 15.4% who were 65 years of age or older.  The median age was 37 years. For every 100 females, there were 93.7 males.  For every 100 females age 18 and over, there were 88.5 males.

The median income for a household in the city was $62,045, and the median income for a family was $76,580. Males had a median income of $52,071 versus $30,962 for females. The per capita income for the city was $31,227.  About 3.5% of families and 5.6% of the population were below the poverty line, including 5.2% of those under age 18 and 1.8% of those age 65 or over.

Colleges
Covenant College, a Presbyterian college, is located in neighboring Dade County. The college became infamous for Mark David Chapman, the assassin of John Lennon, who briefly attended in the early 1970s. Covenant is affiliated with the Presbyterian Church in America (PCA).

References

External links
 City of Lookout Mountain, GA Official Website

Cities in Georgia (U.S. state)
Cities in Walker County, Georgia
Cities in the Chattanooga metropolitan area
Lookout Mountain